Van Veen or Van Veen Kreid is a former motorcycle manufacturer. It was founded in Amsterdam by Henk van Veen, the Dutch importer of Kreidler motorcycles. 

Van Veen completed its first prototype in 1974 using a 1000 cc Comotor 624 twin-rotor Wankel engine, and in November 1974 it was exhibited at the Cologne motorcycle show with front and rear cast wheels and triple Brembo disc brakes.

Limited production of the OCR 1000 model began in 1978 and ceased in 1981, after poor press reviews and complications with Comotor engine production. As well as problems with the Comotor engine, weight (700 lbs/320 kg) and price ($US15,000) also contributed to lack of sales. 38 examples were built.

By 2011, the leftover OCR 1000 parts had been purchased by Andries Wielinga, who built 10 complete motorcycles for sale.

References

 "Van Veen Group", brochure about the history of the Van Veen Group. About 1980.

Motorcycles powered by Wankel engines
Motorcycle manufacturers of the Netherlands
Defunct companies of the Netherlands
Dutch companies established in 1978
Vehicle manufacturing companies established in 1978